The Ladakh Autonomous Hill Development Council, Leh (LAHDC Leh) is an Autonomous District Council that administers the Leh district of Ladakh, India.

History

The council was created under the Ladakh Autonomous Hill Development Council Act 1995, following demands of Ladakhi people to make Leh District a new Indian Union Territory because of its religious and cultural differences with the rest of Jammu and Kashmir. In October 1993, the Indian Union Government and the Jammu and Kashmir State Government agreed to grant Ladakh the status of Autonomous Hill Council.

The council came into being with the holding of elections on 28 August 1995. The inaugural meeting of the council was held at Leh on 3 September 1995. An Autonomous Hill Council has also been established in neighboring Kargil District. The Hill Council in Kargil came in to existence in July 2003.

In 2003, as part of its "healing touch policy", the J&K government announced popular elections for the Autonomous Hill Development Council in Kargil, which was meant to strengthen participatory forms of development, governance and democratic state-building in the war-ravaged district.

Powers

The autonomous hill councils work with village panchayats to take decisions on economic development, healthcare, education, land use, taxation, and local governance which are further reviewed at the block headquarters in the presence of the chief executive councillor and executive councillors. The administration of Union Territory of Ladakh looks after law and order, communications and the higher education in the districts.

Election Results

In the elections for the LAHDC on 26 October, the BJP won 15 out of 26 seats.

Members of the Executive Council
The members of the executive committee are as follows:

Vision 2025

On 8 May 2013 mutual collaboration for sustainable development in Ladakh in the tune with Ladakh Vision Document 2025 was jointly organised by LAHDC and NABARD at Sindhu Sanskriti Kendra in Leh. The workshop-cum-discussion session was inaugurated by the then Chief Executive Councillor of Ladakh Autonomous Hill Development Council, Rigzin Spalbar by lighting up the lamp in the presence of Executive Councillors.
 
In his introductory speech, Rigzin Spalbar talked about Ladakh Vision Document 2025 which was prepared in 2005 by a committee of 20 members headed by Sonam Dawa, former Chief Engineer and Advisor of Ladakh Ecological Development Group. These members belonging to different fields of expertise had put a great effort in the conceptualisation of the Vision Document. CEC took the opportunity to felicitate them at the function with a traditional scarf and a memento.

See also
 Ladakh Marathon, a marathon organised by LAHDC
 Ladakh Autonomous Hill Development Council, Kargil

References

External links
Ladakh Autonomous Hill Development Council, Leh

Government of Ladakh
Autonomous regions of India
States and territories established in 1995
Leh district
1995 establishments in Jammu and Kashmir